Schizo Deluxe is the eleventh studio album by Canadian heavy metal band Annihilator, released on November 8, 2005, by AFM Records.

Track listing

Credits
Jeff Waters - guitars, bass, lead vocals on "Too Far Gone"
Dave Padden - vocals
Tony Chappelle - drums, backing vocals (tracks 1, 3, 6, 9)

Guest/Session
Sean Brophy - backing vocals (tracks 1, 3, 6, 9)
Dan Beehler - backing vocals (tracks 1, 3, 6, 9), End Scream (track 7)
Verena Baumgardt - backing vocals (track 5)
Kathy Waters - backing vocals (track 5)
Altan (de Paris) Zia - additional vocals (track 10)

Miscellaneous staff
Jeff Waters - producer, engineering
Chris Coldrick - mixing, mastering
Gyula Havancsák - cover art, design

References

Annihilator (band) albums
2005 albums
AFM Records albums